Vvedensky is a rural locality (a khutor) in Rakityansky District of Belgorod Oblast, Russia, located  from the urban-type settlement of Rakitnoye, the administrative center of the district.

References

Rural localities in Rakityansky District